Ropica sechellarum is a species of beetle in the family Cerambycidae. It was described by Breuning in 1957. It contains the subspecies Ropica sechellarum interruptefasciata and Ropica sechellarum sechellarum.

References

sechellarum
Beetles described in 1957